The Anglican Church of St Peter in Redlynch, Somerset, England was built in about 1750. It is a Grade II* listed building.

History
The church was built in about 1750 by Stephen Fox-Strangways, 1st Earl of Ilchester (1704–1776) on his estate of Redlynch, to the designs of Nathaniel Ireson of Wincanton, who was also the master-builder of his new mansion house known as Redlynch Park. It replaced the medieval parish church which stood on the same spot.

Architecture
The stone building has Doulting stone dressings and Welsh slate roofs. The five bays make up a single-cell plan. The porch and vestry have been added since the original construction. On the roof is a bell turret.

The interior includes panels with plasterwork decorations and a reredos with Ionic columns. There is a memorial to a soldier from World War I.

See also  
 List of ecclesiastical parishes in the Diocese of Bath and Wells

References

Grade II* listed buildings in South Somerset
Grade II* listed churches in Somerset
Church of England church buildings in South Somerset